Balboa is an American hardcore band, from Philadelphia, United States.

Discography

Studio releases
Balboa LP (2003, Word Salad Records)
Balboa CD (2004 re-release, Forge Again Records)
Manifeste Canibale EP (2005, Forge Again Records)

Compilations
A Vision to Be Heard (2004, "Closer than Breathing", "Letters on a Regicide Peace")
The Way (2004, "Colorguard/Transluscent")

Splits
with Nitro Mega Prayer 7" (2005, Forge Again Records)
with Aussitot Mort 7" (Forge Again Records)
Project Mercury with Rosetta LP (Level Plane Records)
with Plague Sermon LP (2010, Magic Bullet Records & Midmarch Records)

Members

Current members
 Peter Bloom – vocals
 Armando Morales – bass guitar
 Dave Pacifico – guitar
 Drew Juergens – drums

Former members
 Michael Saretsky – guitar (2000–2004)
 John Wanner – drums (2000–2001)
 Charlie Askew – bass (2000–2001)

References

External links
 Official website
 Official MySpace

Hardcore punk groups from Pennsylvania